Night at the Inn or variation, may refer to:

Literature
 "Night at the Inn" (story), a 1960 short story by Georgette Heyer; see List of works by Georgette Heyer
 "A Night at Two Inns" (story), a 1985 short story by Phyllis Ann Karr; appearing in the Sword and Sorceress series
 "One Night at the Inn" (story), a short story by Millea Kenin; see Sword and Sorceress series

Other uses
 "A Night at the Inn", an episode of Amphibia

See also
 Night Inn, a 1947 Chinese film
 "The Night Inn" (song), a 2016 song by Radwimps off the album Your Name (album)
 Inn (disambiguation)
 Night (disambiguation)